Irja Koikson (born 18 July 1980) is an Estonian former footballer who played as a midfielder for the Estonia women's national team.

Career
Koikson played in the first ever official match for Estonia, against Lithuania. The game took place about a month after her 14th birthday. In total, she played for the Estonia national team 26 times between 1994 and 2005, scoring one goal.

References

1980 births
Living people
Women's association football midfielders
Estonian women's footballers
Estonia women's international footballers
Sportspeople from Pärnu